

Hobson may refer to:

People and fictional characters 
 Hobson (surname)
 Hobson R. Reynolds (1898–1991), American politician and judge

Places

New Zealand 
 Hobson County, New Zealand, a former local authority
 Mount Hobson (Auckland), a volcanic cone in the Auckland Volcanic Field
 Mount Hobson (Great Barrier Island), the largest mountain on Great Barrier Island

United States 
 Hobson, Jefferson County, Alabama
 Hobson, Randolph County, Alabama, an unincorporated community
 Hobson, Washington County, Alabama, a census-designated place and unincorporated community
 Hobson, Missouri, an unincorporated community
 Hobson, Montana, a city
 Hobson, Nevada, a ghost town
 Hobson, Texas, an unincorporated community
 Hobson, Virginia, a city

Elsewhere 
 Hobson Lake, British Columbia, Canada
 Hobson, County Durham, a village in England

Other uses 
 Hobson (New Zealand electorate), a former New Zealand Parliamentary electorate
 Hobson Street, Auckland, New Zealand, a major street
 , a destroyer which served in World War II

See also 
 Hobson Block, a building in West Union, Iowa, United States, on the National Register of Historic Places
 Hobson site, a Native American archaeological site in Ohio
 Hobson Plan, an organizational structure established by the United States Air Force in 1948
 Hobson v. Hansen, an American federal court case
 Hobson-Jobson, alternative title of a book and a phrase in English
 Hobson's choice, a free choice in which only one option is offered
 Hobson City, Alabama, a town
 Hobsonville, New Zealand and Oregon
 Hopson (disambiguation)